Happy Birthday is an American 2002 film directed by Yen Tan and starring Benjamin Patrick, Michelle E. Michael and John Frazier. It is Tan's debut long feature film.

Synopsis
The film recounts two days in the lives of five very different characters all born on June 12, that are faced with problems as their birthday approaches: Jim (Benjamin Patrick), a gay, overweight telemarketer working for a weight loss program is facing self-esteem problems; Ron (John Frazier), a church minister, preaches about conversion but himself is addicted to watching gay porn; Javed (Devashish Saxena), a Pakistani who lives in the U.S. with a gay porn actor, is faced by the double dilemma of being condemned by his Muslim family and is in imminent danger of being deported from the States; Kelly (Michelle E. Michael), a lesbian executive, weathers a breakup with her lover and considers an earlier affair; and Tracy (Ethel Lung), a young Asian lesbian, goes back in the closet when her mother renders a visit.

Cast
Benjamin Patrick as Jim
Michelle E. Michael as Kelly
John Frazier as Ron
Devashish Saxena as Javed
Ethel Lung as Tracy
Denton Blane Everett as Greg
Xiao Fei Zhao as Mom
Lynn Chambers as Julie
Derik Webb as Troy
Chip Gilliam as Brian	
Natalie Thrash as Tricia
Debbie Rey as Sophia
Ryan Harper as Ricky
James M. Johnston as Porn director
David Lowery as Videographer

Awards
In 2002, won the Jury Prize for "Best Feature - Gay Male" at the Philadelphia International Gay & Lesbian Film Festival
In 2002, director Yen Tan won New Directors Showcase - Bets Feature award for Happy Birthday at the Portland LGBT Film Festival
Also earned an honorable mention at Image+Nation in Montreal

External links
Happy Birthday website 

2002 films
American LGBT-related films
2002 directorial debut films
Films directed by Yen Tan
Films about conversion therapy
Films about gay male pornography
Films about pornography
2002 LGBT-related films
LGBT-related drama films
2002 drama films
American drama films
2000s American films